Roman Smirnov may refer to:
 Roman Smirnov (sprinter) (born 1984), Russian sprinter runner
 Roman Smirnov (speed skater) (born 1986), Belarusian speed skater

See also
 Smirnov (surname)
 Smirnoff (surname)